The Village Shoemakers is a Finnish silent comedy film made in 1923, directed and produced by Erkki Karu, written by Artturi Järviluoma and starred by Axel Slangus. The film is based on the 1864 play Heath Cobblers, written by Aleksis Kivi, and is the first of several film versions of the play.

The film was shot at Suomi-Filmi's Vironkatu studio in Helsinki and outdoor filming was made in the villages of Pilpala and Hunsala in Loppi, Tavastia Proper. The film was a great spectator success, although it was not as popular as another Erkki Karu film completed the same year, Koskenlaskijan morsian. The film has been criticized as the most silent Finnish silent film to watch in Finnish. Kurt Jäger's cinematography in the final scene gets a special mention. It is said to continue to successfully defy the ruthless tooth of time.

The Village Shoemakers premiered on 11 November 1923 in the Bio-Bio and Edison Theaters in Helsinki. The film was also distributed in Sweden and Norway.

References

External links
 

1923 films
Silent films
Finnish comedy films
Finnish romantic drama films
Finnish films based on plays